An antithyroid agent is a hormone antagonist acting upon thyroid hormones.

The main antithyroid drugs are carbimazole (in the UK), methimazole (in the US), and propylthiouracil (PTU). A less common antithyroid agent is potassium perchlorate.

Graves' disease
In Graves' disease, treatment with antithyroid medications must be given for six months to two years, in order to be effective. Even then, upon cessation of the drugs, the hyperthyroid state may recur. Side effects of the antithyroid medications include a potentially fatal reduction in the level of white blood cells.

A randomized control trial testing single dose treatment for Graves' found methimazole achieved euthyroid state more effectively after 12 weeks than did propylthiouracil (77.1% on methimazole 15 mg vs 19.4% in the propylthiouracil 150 mg groups). But generally both drugs are considered equivalent.

A study has shown no difference in outcome for adding thyroxine to antithyroid medication and continuing thyroxine versus placebo after antithyroid medication withdrawal. However, two markers were found that can help predict the risk of recurrence. These two markers are an elevated level of thyroid stimulating hormone receptor antibodies (TSHR-Ab) and smoking. A positive TSHR-Ab at the end of antithyroid drug treatment increases the risk of recurrence to 90% (sensitivity 39%, specificity 98%), a negative TSHR-Ab at the end of antithyroid drug treatment is associated with a 78% chance of remaining in remission. Smoking was shown to have an impact independent to a positive TSHR-Ab.

Competitive antagonists of thyroid stimulating hormone receptors are currently being investigated as a possible treatment for Grave's disease.

Adverse effects
The most dangerous side-effect is agranulocytosis (1/250, more in PTU); this is an idiosyncratic reaction which generally resolves on cessation of drug. It occurs in about 0.2 to 0.3% of cases treated with antithyroid drugs. Others include granulocytopenia (dose dependent, which improves on cessation of the drug) and aplastic anemia, and—for propylthiouracil—severe, fulminant liver failure. Patients on these medications should see a doctor if they develop sore throat or fever.

The most common side effects are rash and peripheral neuritis. These drugs also cross the placenta and are secreted in breast milk. Lugol's iodine is used to block hormone synthesis before surgery.

Mechanism of action
The mechanisms of action are not completely understood. Some scientists believe that anti-thyroids inhibit iodination of tyrosyl residues in thyroglobulin. It is thought that they inhibit the thyroperoxidase catalyzed oxidation reactions by acting as substrates for the postulated peroxidase-iodine complex, thus competitively inhibiting the interaction with the amino acid tyrosine. Propylthiouracil additionally may reduce the de-iodination of T4 into T3 in peripheral tissues.

See also
 H03B code of antithyroid preparations

References

External links
 

Antithyroid drugs